The 2015 Pan American Judo Championships was held in Edmonton, Alberta, Canada from April 24–26, 2015.

Results

Men's events

Women's events

Medal table

See also
Judo at the 2015 Pan American Games

References

External links
 
 2015 Pan American Championships results
 Pan American Judo Confederation

American Championships
2015
2015 in Canadian sports
Qualification tournaments for the 2015 Pan American Games
Judo competitions in Canada
International sports competitions hosted by Canada